Joe Forrester is an American crime/drama television series, starring Lloyd Bridges as a uniformed foot patrol officer in a run-down neighborhood of Los Angeles. Patricia Crowley co-starred as Georgia Cameron, Joe's romantic interest. Former NYPD Detective Eddie Egan played Sgt. Bernie Vincent, Joe's supervisor. Dwan Smith played Jolene, a resident of the neighborhood Joe patrolled.

Character 
Joe Forrester's character was introduced on the TV series Police Story, in a special 90-minute episode "The Return of Joe Forrester", written by Mark Rodgers and directed by Virgil W. Vogel, later retitled Cop on the Beat (1975), and syndicated as a TV-movie.  In this pilot, Forrester, a second generation policeman, is a plainclothes officer in LAPD's Metro Division who convinces his superiors to put him back in uniform, and back on a foot beat, in a neighborhood beset by a series of armed robberies which are invariably followed by a vicious rape. When the case is solved, Forrester elects to stay in uniform, and on his foot beat, leading to the subsequent series.

Plot 
Forrester is a veteran cop in Los Angeles, assigned to a foot beat. He is a highly respected officer in the community, effectively fighting crime every day because, as a foot patrolman, he is able to keep personal contact with the people he protects, building trust and empathy. Like other cops, he busts thieves, drug dealers, murderers, and other criminals who threaten the residents of his beat.

Episodes

References 
The Review of the news, Vol 12

External links 
 

1975 American television series debuts
1976 American television series endings
1970s American crime television series
1970s American drama television series
NBC original programming
Television series by Sony Pictures Television
Fictional portrayals of the Los Angeles Police Department
Television shows set in Los Angeles